IRIS Nooh (also spelt Nuh or Nouh) is the second Kilo-class attack submarine of Islamic Republic of Iran Navy, serving in the Southern Fleet.

Construction and commissioning
The contract to build Nooh and Taregh was signed in 1988. It was reportedly worth $750 million for two submarines, with an option for the third. Her keel was laid down at Admiralty Shipyard in Saint Petersburg in 1989. She was launched in 1992 and was commissioned on  6 June 1993.

The submarine is named after Noah.

Service history
According to Jane's, there is no proof that the submarine has ever returned to Russia for a refit. As of September 2017, Nooh was under some major repairs by Iranian personnel in the naval factories.

See also
 List of current ships of the Islamic Republic of Iran Navy

References

 
 

Submarines of Iran
Attack submarines
Kilo-class submarines
1992 ships
Ships built at Admiralty Shipyard
Submarines of the Islamic Republic of Iran Navy